PS-102 Karachi East-IV is a constituency of the Provincial Assembly of Sindh.

General elections 2018

General elections were scheduled to be held on 25 July 2018. Arsalan Taj Hussain of Pakistan Tehreek-e-Insaf won the seat by securing 47,949 votes.

See also
 PS-101 Karachi East-III
 PS-103 Karachi East-V

References

External links
 Election commission Pakistan's official website
 Awazoday.com check result
 Official Website of Government of Sindh

Constituencies of Sindh